Jon the Dentist (born John Vaughan, 1965) is a British hardhouse and trance music record producer. He released many popular singles including "Feel So Good" and "Imagination" with Ollie Jaye, both of which reached the UK Singles Chart.

John was born on 2 October 1965 to parents Shirley and David in Eltham, London, and grew up in nearby Shooter's Hill with his sister Kate.

References

External links

Living people
British record producers
British DJs
1965 births